The demographics of Hispanic and Latino Americans depict a population that is the second-largest ethnic group in the United States, 62 million people or 18.7% of the national population. 

The Latino population is much younger than the rest of the country,of no less than two dozen national origins and of every race, with a longer life expectancy than their fellow Americans, and geographically concentrated in the southwestern United States.

History
Hispanic and Latino Americans (along with Asian Americans, most notably) have contributed to an important demographic change in the United States since the 1960s whereby minority groups now compose one-third of the population. Nearly one in six Americans was Hispanic or Latino as of 2009, a total of 48.4 million out of the estimated 307 million Americans. High rates of immigration and fertility have shaped the growth of the Hispanic and Latino population.
.

Population

Hispanic and Latino Population by state or territory (2000–2010)

In 2011, Hispanics accounted for 16.7% of the national population, or around 52 million people. The Hispanic growth rate over the April 1, 2000 to July 1, 2007 period was 28.7%—about four times the rate of the nation's total population (at 7.2%). The growth rate from July 1, 2005 to July 1, 2006 alone was 3.4%—about three and a half times the rate of the nation's total population (at 1.0%). Based on the 2010 census, Hispanics are now the largest minority group in 191 out of 366 metropolitan areas in the US. The projected Hispanic population of the United States for July 1, 2050 is 132.8 million people, or 30.2% of the nation's total projected population on that date.

Geographic distribution

As of 2000, the ten most populous places with Hispanic majorities were 
 East Los Angeles (97% Hispanic), 
 Laredo, Texas (94%), 
 Brownsville, Texas (91%)
 Hialeah, Florida (90%), 
 McAllen, Texas (80%), 
 El Paso, Texas (77%), 
 Santa Ana, California (76%), 
 El Monte, California (72%)
 Oxnard, California (66%), 
 Miami, Florida (66%).

The Hispanic population of Los Angeles County, California, numbering 4.7 million, is the largest of all counties in the nation, comprising 47 percent of the county's ten million residents.

Hispanic and Latino Population by state or territory (2000–2010)

Hispanic and Latino populations of each state by region of origin

Over 60% of the Hispanic and Latino population in the United States is of Mexican ancestry. The influence of Mexican and Mexican-American culture is felt throughout the country, with the epicenter of this influence located in the southwestern United States, including Texas, Nevada, Arizona and Southern California.

The remaining 40% of Latinos in the United States hail from the Caribbean, Central America and South America. Caribbean Latinos are those with ancestry originating in the Caribbean islands of Puerto Rico, Cuba, and the Dominican Republic. Puerto Ricans are the second-largest Hispanic group in the U.S. after those of Mexican descent. There are large Puerto Rican and Dominican populations in the Northeastern states, including the urban centers of New York, New Jersey and Boston as well as large Cuban and Puerto Rican populations in Florida, including the influential Cuban-American enclave in Miami and a Puerto Rican community in Orlando that is the third largest in the world.

Central American Latinos come from El Salvador, Guatemala, Honduras, Nicaragua, Panama, Belize and Costa Rica. The largest numbers of Hispanics with Central American origins can be found in California, Texas, and the DC Metropolitan area. Due to its large agricultural industry, Florida has been a frequent destination for Guatemalan and Honduran migrant workers who often live and work alongside the state's large population of Mexicans.

Latinos from South America come from Colombia, Venezuela, Peru, Ecuador, Chile, Bolivia and Paraguay. Significant numbers of Colombians and people of Colombian ancestry live in Miami and throughout Florida, as do Peruvians, who also have enclaves in New Jersey and the DC Metropolitical Area. Other Hispanic and Latino groups come from Spain, and the descendants of the colonial Spanish in Florida, Louisiana, and the US southwest.

Race
Historically, over half of the Hispanic and Latino American population self-identifies as White. The largest number of White Hispanics come from within the Mexican community, the highest percentage of White Hispanics among major Hispanic groups comes from the Cuban American community, also high percentages of White Hispanics from Hispanic groups come from within the Colombian and also Spanish communities. The largest number of Black Hispanics come from within the Puerto Rican community, while the highest percentage of Black Hispanics among major Hispanic groups come from the Dominican community. Significant numbers of Black Hispanics can also be found among the Central American communities.

The largest number of Asian Hispanics come from within the Mexican community, while the highest percentage of Asian Hispanics come from the Peruvian community. The largest population of Native American Hispanic come from within the Mexican community and the highest percentage of Native American Hispanics among major Hispanic groups come from within the Guatemalan community.

Though comprising very small percentages of the Hispanic and Latino American population, and even smaller percentages of the total U.S. population, some of the preceding racial subgroups make up large minorities among the respective racial groups, overall. For instance, Hispanics and Latinos who are American Indian or Alaska Native compose 15% of all American Indians and Alaska Natives (per the ACS estimates). Meanwhile, the 120,000 Hispanics and Latinos who are of Native Hawaiian and Other Pacific Islander race compose 22% of this entire race nationally (per the Population Estimates). Again, nearly a third of the overall 'Two or more race' population is Hispanic or Latino (ACS).

Sexuality
According to a Gallup survey conducted from June to September 2012, it found that 4 percent of Hispanic and Latino Americans self identify as LGBT; this is greater than the estimated 3.4 percent of American adults that self identify as LGBT in the total population, but the difference is well within the margin of error for the number of LGBT Latinos in the 121 000 sample population of the survey.

Socioeconomic status

Education 
According to the U.S Census Bureau, Hispanics are among the least educated ethnic group. In 2000, about 530,000 Hispanics and Latinos 16–19 years of age were high school dropouts, yielding a dropout rate of 21.1 percent for all Hispanics and Latinos.

11 percent of Hispanics/Latinos have earned a bachelor's degree or higher, compared with 17 percent of non-Hispanic blacks, 30 percent of non-Hispanic whites, and 49 percent of Asian Americans. Often, Hispanic and Latino youth begin schooling without the necessary economic and social resources that other children have. One frequent cause is their being the children of immigrant parents with low socioeconomic status and language barriers that result in a lack of knowledge about the U.S. education system. These unfavorable conditions frequently spawn others, such as weak parent-teacher relationships.

The overall average years of schooling for Hispanics and Latinos (10.5) does not include high school graduation (12 years). There is a notable education gap between foreign-born Hispanics, who have more difficulties with language barriers, and U.S.-born Hispanics. The latter only lag non-Hispanic Whites by 1.3 years of schooling, and nearly tie African Americans, as seen in the table below.

Hispanics can also attend Hispanic-serving institutions (HSIs), which are colleges or universities in the United States that attempt to assist first generation, majority low income Hispanic students. There are over 250 schools that have been designated as an HSI.

Table 1

Average Years of Schooling, by Gender, Ethnicity, and
Nativity
Men, by Nativity 					Women, by Nativity

Ethnicity	All	Foreign-Born	US Born	All	Foreign-Born	US Born
Whites			13.6			13.6
Black			12.4			12.8
All Hispanics	10.5	9.5	12.2	10.8	9.8	12.4
Mexicans	9.8	8.5	12.1	10.1	8.6	12.2
Puerto Ricans	11.7	11.2	12.4	12.0	11.4	12.7
Cubans	12.7	12.4	13.6	12.9	12.5	14.2

(NOTE: The samples include individuals ages 25 to 59.)

Employment
Employment and earnings are a measure of labor market success, and depend on educational attainment. Given the lower level of education of the Hispanic or Latino population and the growing need for a college degree for entry-level jobs, Hispanics and Latinos are behind when entering into the labor force. The annual employment rate is defined as the percentage of individuals who worked any period of time during the calendar year. Although Hispanics do not lag behind non-Hispanic blacks when it comes to employment rates, they do lag non-Hispanic whites. There is a major gap between male and female rates in Hispanics due to high fertility rates and female absence from the labor force to give birth. Furthermore, nativity plays a major role in employment rates because U.S. born Hispanics are more accustomed to the U.S. labor market.

Table2

Annual Employment Rates (Percentages), by Gender,
Ethnicity and Nativity

Men, by Nativity                                 Women, by Nativity

Ethnicity	All	Foreign-Born	US Born	All	Foreign-Born	US Born
Whites			91.8			80.2
Blacks			77.4			77.7
Hispanics	86.8	87.5	85.6	67.0	61.2	76.3
Mexicans	87.8	88.5	86.5	64.7	56.1	76.4
Puerto Ricans	80.0	76.6	83.8	67.7	60.8	75.5
Cubans	87.3	86.8	89.1	74.7	72.5	82.5
|}
(NOTE: The samples include individuals ages 25 to 59.)

Earnings
In 2006, adults 18 and older with a master's, professional, or doctoral degree earned an average of $79,946, while those with less than a high school diploma earned about $19,915.

Hispanic and Latino median earnings are significantly lower than the median earnings of the total U.S. population, a result of the lower education levels of the former group. Yet, there are other causes of the earnings gap besides education. A report released by the Census Bureau in 2003 estimated that the average lifetime earnings of Hispanics with an advanced degree are $500,000 less than those of non-Hispanic whites with an equivalent education.

Homeownership

Hispanic homeownership in 2016 was 45.6%. Around half of Hispanic-Americans live in their own house.

Poverty
Estimates show that about 22 percent of the Hispanic and Latino population is below the poverty level, with the rate being higher for children, while 8.3 percent of non-Hispanic whites and about 25 percent of African American remain under the poverty level as well.

See also
List of California communities with Hispanic- or Latino-majority populations in the 2010 census
Demographics of the United States
List of Mexican American communities
List of Stateside Puerto Rican communities

Notes

References
Brindis C.D., Driscoll A.K., Biggs M.A. & Valderrama L.T. 2002. Fact Sheet on Latino	Youth: Income & Poverty. 
Firestone, Juanita M. and Harris, Richard J.; "Educational and Occupational Attainment". 	
Marcelo, M Suárez-Orozco and Páez Mariela; (2002) Latinos: Remaking America. University of California Press.  
Tienda, Marta and Mitchell, Faith; (Eds). (2006) Hispanics and the Future of America. Washington, DC: National Academies Press.  
US Census Bureau. (2007). Earnings Gap by Census Bureau Data on Educational Attainment. 
US Census Bureau. (2006). US Hispanic Population:2006 Power Point.

Further reading

Hispanic and Latino demographics in the United States
Hispanic And Latino Americans